CFIM-FM is a French language community radio station that operates at 92.7 FM in Les Îles-de-la-Madeleine, Canada.

The station signed on in 1981 and is currently owned by Diffusion Communications des Iles Inc.

The station is a member of the Association des radiodiffuseurs communautaires du Québec.

External links
CFIM
CFIM-FM history - Canadian Communication Foundation
Listen Live (Flash Player)

Fim
Fim
Fim
Radio stations established in 1981
1981 establishments in Quebec